Licuala is a genus of palms, in the tribe Trachycarpeae, commonly found in tropical forests of southern China, Southeast Asia, the Himalayas, New Guinea and the western Pacific Ocean islands.

Description and uses
Licuala spp. are fan palms, with the leaves mostly circular in outline, sometimes undivided but more usually divided into wedge-shaped segments. Licuala acutifida is the source of cane for the walking stick nicknamed the Penang-lawyer by colonials, probably from the Malay phrase  for a wild areca, although the term may also refer to the use of these canes as deadly knobkerries to assassinate litigious enemies. Several species of Licuala have been transferred into a new genus Lanonia.

Species
Plants of the World Online currently (February 2021) includes 167 accepted species:

 Licuala acuminata Burret
 Licuala acutifida Mart.
 Licuala adscendens Barfod & Heatubun
 Licuala ahlidurii Saw
 Licuala angustiloba Burret
 Licuala anomala Becc.
 Licuala aruensis Becc.
 Licuala atrovirens Saw
 Licuala atroviridis A.J.Hend., N.K.Ban & N.Q.Dung
 Licuala averyanovii A.J.Hend., N.K.Ban & N.Q.Dung
 Licuala bachmaensis A.J.Hend., N.K.Ban & N.Q.Dung
 Licuala bacularia Becc.
 Licuala bayana Saw
 Licuala beccariana (K.Schum. & Lauterb.) Furtado
 Licuala bellatula Becc.
 Licuala bidentata Becc.
 Licuala bidoupensis A.J.Hend., N.K.Ban & N.Q.Dung
 Licuala bifida Heatubun & Barfod
 Licuala bintulensis Becc.
 Licuala bissula Miq.
 Licuala borneensis Becc.
 Licuala bracteata Gagnep.
 Licuala brevicalyx Becc.
 Licuala bruneiana Saw
 Licuala burretii Saw
 Licuala cabalionii Dowe
 Licuala caespitosa A.J.Hend. & N.Q.Dung
 Licuala cameronensis Saw
 Licuala campestris Saw
 Licuala cattienensis A.J.Hend., N.K.Ban & N.Q.Dung
 Licuala celebica Miq.
 Licuala chaiana Saw
 Licuala collina Saw
 Licuala concinna Burret
 Licuala cordata Becc.
 Licuala corneri Furtado
 Licuala crassiflora Barfod
 Licuala dakrongensis A.J.Hend., N.K.Ban & B.V.Thanh
 Licuala debilis Becc.
 Licuala densiflora Becc.
 Licuala distans Ridl.
 Licuala egregia Saw
 Licuala elegans Blume
 Licuala ellipsoidalis A.J.Hend., N.K.Ban & N.Q.Dung
 Licuala elliptica Saw
 Licuala exigua Saw
 Licuala ferruginea Becc.
 Licuala ferruginoides Becc.
 Licuala flammula Saw
 Licuala flavida Ridl.
 Licuala flexuosa Burret
 Licuala fordiana Becc.
 Licuala fractiflexa Saw
 Licuala gjellerupii Becc.
 Licuala glaberrima Gagnep.
 Licuala glabra Griff.
 Licuala graminifolia Heatubun & Barfod
 Licuala grandiflora Ridl.
 Licuala grandis (T.Moore) H.Wendl.
 Licuala hallieriana Becc.
 Licuala honbaensis A.J.Hend. & N.Q.Dung
 Licuala honheoensis A.J.Hend. & N.Q.Dung
 Licuala insignis Becc.
 Licuala intermedia Saw
 Licuala kamarudinii Saw
 Licuala kemamanensis Furtado
 Licuala khoonmengii Saw
 Licuala kiahii Furtado
 Licuala kingiana Becc.
 Licuala klossii Ridl.
 Licuala kuchingensis Saw
 Licuala kunstleri Becc.
 Licuala lambii Saw
 Licuala lamdongensis A.J.Hend. & N.Q.Dung
 Licuala lanata J.Dransf.
 Licuala lanuginosa Ridl.
 Licuala lauterbachii Dammer & K.Schum.
 Licuala leopoldii Saw
 Licuala leprosa Dammer ex Becc.
 Licuala leptocalyx Burret
 Licuala leucocarpa Saw
 Licuala linearis Burret
 Licuala longicalycata Furtado
 Licuala longiflora A.J.Hend., N.K.Ban & N.Q.Dung
 Licuala longipes Griff.
 Licuala longispadix Banka & Barfod
 Licuala macrantha Burret
 Licuala maculata Saw
 Licuala magna Burret
 Licuala malajana Becc.
 Licuala mattanensis Becc.
 Licuala meijeri Saw
 Licuala merguensis Becc.
 Licuala micholitzii Ridl.
 Licuala micrantha Becc.
 Licuala mirabilis Furtado
 Licuala miriensis Saw
 Licuala modesta Becc.
 Licuala montana Dammer & K.Schum.
 Licuala moszkowskiana Becc.
 Licuala moyseyi Furtado
 Licuala mukahensis Saw
 Licuala mustapana Saw
 Licuala nana Blume
 Licuala naumannii Burret
 Licuala naumoniensis Becc.
 Licuala nuichuaensis A.J.Hend. & N.Q.Dung
 Licuala olivifera Becc.
 Licuala oliviformis Becc.
 Licuala oninensis Becc.
 Licuala orbicularis Becc.
 Licuala oryzoides Saw
 Licuala pachycalyx Burret
 Licuala pahangensis Furtado
 Licuala palas Saw
 Licuala paludosa Griff.
 Licuala parviflora Dammer ex Becc.
 Licuala parvula A.J.Hend. & N.Q.Dung
 Licuala patens Ridl.
 Licuala paucisecta Burret
 Licuala peekelii Lauterb.
 Licuala peltata Roxb. ex Buch.-Ham.
 Licuala penduliflora (Blume) Zipp. ex Blume
 Licuala petiolulata Becc.
 Licuala pilosa Saw
 Licuala pitta Barfod & Pongsatt.
 Licuala platydactyla Becc.
 Licuala polyschista K.Schum. & Lauterb.
 Licuala poonsakii Hodel
 Licuala pseudovalida Saw
 Licuala pulchella Burret
 Licuala pumila Blume
 Licuala punctulata Burret
 Licuala pusilla Becc.
 Licuala radula Gagnep.
 Licuala ramsayi (F.Muell.) Domin
 Licuala reptans Becc.
 Licuala rheophytica Saw
 Licuala ridleyana Becc.
 Licuala robinsoniana Becc.
 Licuala robusta Warb. ex K.Schum. & Lauterb.
 Licuala rubiginosa Saw
 Licuala rumphii Blume
 Licuala ruthiae Saw
 Licuala sabahana Saw
 Licuala sallehana Saw
 Licuala sarawakensis Becc.
 Licuala scortechinii Becc.
 Licuala simplex (K.Schum. & Lauterb.) Becc.
 Licuala spathellifera Becc.
 Licuala spectabilis Miq.
 Licuala spicata Becc.
 Licuala spinosa Wurmb
 Licuala steinii Burret
 Licuala stipitata Burret
 Licuala stongensis Saw
 Licuala tanycola H.E.Moore
 Licuala taynguyensis Barfod & Borchs.
 Licuala telifera Becc.
 Licuala tenuissima Saw
 Licuala terengganuensis Saw
 Licuala thoana Saw & J.Dransf.
 Licuala tiomanensis Furtado
 Licuala triphylla Griff.
 Licuala urciflora Barfod & Heatubun
 Licuala whitmorei Saw
 Licuala yiiana Saw

References

 
Arecaceae genera
Flora of Indomalesia